Duo 4 (formerly known as Kanal 11 (literal English translation Channel 11)) is an Estonian TV channel owned by Duo Media Networks. The name of the channel was derived from a play on words; in the Estonian language, "Üksteist", the word for eleven, also means "each other". This meant that the channel promoted itself using sentences such as "We love 11".

Shows

Kanal 11 shows mainly reality shows and serials.
 Saint Tropez
 Aardekütt (Relic Hunter)
 After Chat
  (America's Most Smartest Model) 
 Gok Wan annab moenõu (Gok's Fashion Fix)
  (Footballer's Wives)
 Kardashianid (Keeping up with the Kardashians) 
 Kelgukoerad
 Kokasaade – Lusikas
 Kuidas alasti hea välja näha (How to Look Good Naked)
 Naistevahetus (Wife Swap)
 Nigella ampsud (Nigella Bites)
 Nigella ekspress (Nigella Express)
 Nigella retseptid (Nigella Feasts)
 Night Chat
 Reporter
 Reporter+
 Rooside sõda (Estonian version of Family Feud)
 Superlapsehoidja (Supernanny)
 Täiuslik koduperenaine (Anthea Turner: Perfect Housewife)
 Tantsi, kui oskad! (Estonian version of So You Think You Can Dance)
 Tõeline seks ja linn (Sex and the City)
 Top Shop
 Võluvägi (Charmed)
 Üllatusremont (Changing Rooms)
 90210

References

External links

Television channels in Estonia
Television channels and stations established in 2008
2008 establishments in Estonia
Mass media in Tallinn